SS or RMS Parthia  may refer to one of two ships of the Cunard Line, named after the historic region of Parthia:
  was an iron hulled steamer launched in 1870. She was transferred to John Elder & Co. in 1883, and to the Guion Line in 1884, who renamed her Victoria.
  was a passenger/cargo liner launched in 1947. She was sold to the New Zealand Shipping Company in 1961 and renamed Remuera, and then to the Eastern and Australia Steamship Company and renamed Aramac in 1964. She was scrapped in 1970.

Ship names